Lists of art awards cover some of the notable awards presented for art, some for a specific form or genre, some for artists from one country or region, some more general. The lists are organized by the region of the body issuing the award, although the awards may not be restricted to artists in that region.

Africa

Absa L’Atelier Art Competition South Africa

Americas

Canada

United States

Other

Leonardo da Vinci World Award of Arts, (Mexico: World Cultural Council) 
M&C Fine Arts Awards, Saint Lucia
Musgrave Medal, Jamaica
Pablo Neruda Order of Artistic and Cultural Merit, Chile
PIPA Prize, Brazil
 The GOLD LIST of the Top Contemporary Artists of Today (publication and award), Israel (Art Market Magazine), USA (The Redwood Art Group), Germany (Discovery Art Fair), Italy (Florence Biennale)

Asia

Europe

Oceania

References